Randhurst Ice Arena was an indoor arena located in Mount Prospect, Illinois. The arena, which sat about 2,000 people, was the part-time home of the Chicago Cougars of the World Hockey Association from 1974 to 1975. During the 1974 Avco Cup playoffs, the Cougars' regular home, the International Amphitheatre was being used for other events. Randhurst Ice Arena was built in early 1974 next to Randhurst Mall. Today a Home Depot sits on the ice arena's former location.

References

Demolished sports venues in Illinois
Former buildings and structures in Chicago

World Hockey Association venues
Mount Prospect, Illinois

Defunct indoor ice hockey venues in the United States
Defunct indoor arenas in Illinois